

Karl Koetz (8 February 1908  – 11 June 1977) was a general in the Wehrmacht of Nazi Germany during World War II. He was a recipient of the  Knight's Cross of the Iron Cross with Oak Leaves.

Awards and decorations
 Iron Cross (1939) 2nd Class (13 June 1940) & 1st Class  (1 July 1941)
 Knight's Cross of the Iron Cross with Oak Leaves
 Knight's Cross on 2 October 1941 as Hauptmann and commander of II. / Infanterie-Regiment 46
 Oak Leaves on 1 January 1944 as Oberstleutnant and commander of Grenadier-Regiment 185

References

Citations

Bibliography

 
 

1908 births
1977 deaths
Military personnel from Berlin
People from the Province of Brandenburg
Major generals of the German Army (Wehrmacht)
Recipients of the Knight's Cross of the Iron Cross with Oak Leaves
German prisoners of war in World War II held by the United Kingdom